Flammulaster erinaceellus is a species of fungus in the agaric family Tubariaceae. It was first described in 1876 as Agaricus detersibilis by Charles Horton Peck. Roy Watling transferred it to Flammulaster in 1967. The fruit body has a hemispherical to convex cap  in diameter that is covered with small, erect, brownish scales that can be readily rubbed off. The gills have an adnexed attachment to the stipe. It is either hollow, or stuffed with a pith-like mycelium. The spores measure 7.5–9 by 4–5 µm. Fruiting occurs on logs in the woods.

References

Fungi described in 1876
Fungi of North America
Tubariaceae
Taxa named by Charles Horton Peck